The American Society of Questioned Document Examiners is the world's oldest  society dedicated to the forensic science of questioned document examination with 144 members worldwide.  The current president is Samiah Ibrahim.  The society publishes the Journal of the American Society of Questioned Document Examiners twice a year.

Membership
Membership in the society is open to any practising questioned document examiner who meets the criteria for membership according to the by-laws.

There are eight classes of membership in the society: Regular Members, Provisional Members, Associate Members, Affiliate Members, Corresponding Members, Life Members, Life Corresponding Members, and Honorary Members. Examiners from the United States or Canada are eligible to become Regular members while examiners from other countries are considered to be Corresponding members.

History
In 1913, Albert S. Osborn of New York City invited Elbridge Stein of Pittsburgh to discuss questioned document examination issues beginning the earliest days of the society. J. Fordyce Wood of Chicago, J. Frank Shearman of Wichita, Kansas, and John J. Lomax of Montreal, were invited in the years immediately following. John F. Tyrrell of Milwaukee, WI, began attending early meetings and Albert D. Osborn, the son of Albert S. Osborn, attended in 1919 upon returning from service overseas during World War I. Herbert J. Walter of Winnipeg, Manitoba, Canada, was later invited in 1926 and within the next two years, Edwin H. Fearon of Pittsburgh, PA, Harry E. Cassidy of Richmond, MI, and Scott E. Leslie of Cleveland, OH, joined the group.

James Clark Sellers of Los Angeles, CA was invited and attended the 1930 meeting. At that meeting, Rafael Fernandez Ruenes of Havana, Cuba, also attended. In 1931, John L. Harris of Los Angeles, CA was asked to join. In the meantime, George Walter (son of Herbert J. Walter) became a member. Elwin C. Leslie (son of Scott E. Leslie) attended and participated in the 1939 meeting. George J. Lacy, Houston, TX, was invited and first attended in 1942 as did, Warren T. Johnson. Other names have been relegated to obscurity because of a lack of interest or inability to participate in the rigorous contributory program.

Membership was entirely by invitation and the organization remained informal up until this time. Its meetings were completely educational in scope and annual attendance, as well as full participation in the program, were a requirement for subsequent invitation.

On September 2, 1942, it was decided to formalize the organization and it became known as The American Society of Questioned Document Examiners, its current name.

Presidents 
The following persons have been presidents of the society:

References

External links
 

Questioned document examination
Organizations established in 1942
Forensics organizations
Organizations based in Long Beach, California
Professional associations based in the United States
Forensic science journals
1942 establishments in the United States